The Abner Gaines House or Gaines Tavern History Center was built on the Old Lexington Pike in Walton, Kentucky in 1814. It is the oldest house in Walton and is built in the Federal Style, featuring three stairways and ten carved mantels.

The home's location was home to a tavern as early as 1795. Abner Gaines came to Kentucky from Virginia in 1804, became a Boone County Justice the following year, and purchased this tavern in 1813 before replacing it with the new house the following year. Gaines opened a Post Office in his tavern in 1815; Walton at that time being known as the "Gaines crossroads". Gaines then began the first stagecoach line between Cincinnati, Ohio and Lexington, Kentucky. In 1817 he was appointed Sheriff. Gaines and his wife Elizabeth  Matthews had 13 children.

Local historians speculate that slaves owned by Gaines worked as skilled craftsmen to build the 17-room, -story main house.

The house remained in the Gaines family for four generations and was sold after the Civil War. In 1897, a newspaper article discusses whether to raze the property, but it was repaired by subsequent owners and used as an antiques shop from 1930s until 1997. 
The Abner Gaines house was added to the National Register of Historic Places in 1980. After restoration it reopened as the Gaines Tavern History Center. In 2022, the building was featured on an episode of Ghost Hunters.

See also 
 Old Stone Tavern: Frankfort, Kentucky
 Old Talbott Tavern: Bardstown, Kentucky
 Sherman Tavern: Sherman, Kentucky
 National Register of Historic Places listings in Boone County, Kentucky

References

External links

Abner Gaines House
Gaines House sold to City of Walton
NKY Views: Gaines House
Chronicles of Boone County: Colonel Abner Gaines House (Walton, Ky.)

National Register of Historic Places in Boone County, Kentucky
Houses completed in 1814
Federal architecture in Kentucky
Houses in Boone County, Kentucky
Houses on the National Register of Historic Places in Kentucky
Museums in Boone County, Kentucky
Drinking establishments on the National Register of Historic Places in Kentucky
Museums established in 2006
2006 establishments in Kentucky
History museums in Kentucky
Taverns in the United States